Nils Rygaard (born April 11, 1995) is a Swedish ice hockey player. He is currently playing with the Janesville Jets of the North American Hockey League (NAHL).

Rygaard made his debut with Linköpings HC during the 2013 European Trophy.

References

External links

1995 births
Living people
Linköping HC players
Swedish ice hockey forwards